Zefir Katunchev (born 13 December 1986) is a Bulgarian footballer, who currently plays as a defender for Pirin Gotse Delchev.

References

External links

Living people
1986 births
Bulgarian footballers
Association football defenders
PFC Pirin Gotse Delchev players
First Professional Football League (Bulgaria) players